Jazz Impressions of Lawrence of Arabia is an album led by vibraphonist and composer Walt Dickerson featuring music from the film Lawrence of Arabia (1962) which was recorded in 1963 and first released on the Dauntless label. It was later released on the Audio Fidelity label under the title, Vibes in Motion.

Reception

The Allmusic site awarded the album 4 stars, stating: "This effort from the vibraphonist stretches the parameters of Maurice Jarre's themes". DownBeat reviewer Harvey Pekar wrote: "Many jazz versions of movie soundtracks are weighed down with uninteresting material, but this album is better than most others partly because it has passable thematic material. Dickerson's arranging is eclectic."

Track listing 
All compositions by Maurice Jarre except as indicated
 "Theme from Lawrence of Arabia"  - 2:46
 "That Is the Desert" - 5:08
 "Motif from Overture Part I" - 3:55
 "Motif from Overture Part II" - 3:47
 "Arrival at Auda's Camp" - 2:21
 "Nefud Mirage Part I" - 4:36
 "Nefud Mirage Part II" - 4:20
 "The Voice of the Guns" (Kenneth Alford) - 3:27

Personnel 
Walt Dickerson - vibraphone
Austin Crowe – piano
Ahmed Abdul-Malik (tracks 1 & 2), Henry Grimes (tracks 3-8) – bass
Andrew Cyrille – drums

References 

Walt Dickerson albums
1963 albums
Audio Fidelity Records albums